The amateur foil competition had 54 fencers from 10 nations compete. There was no limit on the number of fencers per nation; 39 of the 54 competitors were French. For the first round, quarterfinals, and repechage, skill and art with the foil was more important to advancing than winning the bout. The event was swept by French fencers: Émile Coste, Henri Masson, and Marcel Boulenger took the top three places. It was the second consecutive Games that France had taken the top two ranks

Background

This was the second appearance of the event, which has been held at every Summer Olympics except 1908 (when there was a foil display only rather than a medal event). None of the fencers from 1896 returned.

Nine of the ten competing nations were making their debut in the men's foil: Austria, Belgium, Haiti, Italy, Peru, Spain, Sweden, Switzerland, and the United States. Only France had previously competed in 1896.

Competition format

The event used a five-round format (four main rounds and a repechage). For the first three rounds (round 1, quarterfinals, repechage) the round consisted of the fencers being paired and fighting a single bout; jury evaluations of skill rather than the match results were used to determine advancement. The last two rounds (semifinals and finals) used round-robin pool play with actual results counting toward placement. Standard foil rules were used, including that touches had to be made with the tip of the foil, the target area was limited to the torso, and priority determined the winner of double touches.

 Round 1: The 54 fencers paired off and faced a single opponent in one bout. The jury selected 37 fencers to advance to the quarterfinals.
 Quarterfinals: The 37 fencers were paired off again, with one fencer having no opponent. Three men withdrew, cancelling one bout altogether and resulting in one fencer fencing twice. The jury selected 10 fencers for the semifinals and 14 more for the repechage.
 Repechage: The 14 fencers selected from the quarterfinals were paired. The jury selected 6 of them to advance. When one qualified fencer withdrew, a 7th fencer was advanced from the repechage.
 Semifinals: The 16 fencers from the quarterfinals and repechage were divided into two pools of 8 fencers each. Each pool played a round robin. The top four fencers in each semifinal pool advanced to the final, while the bottom four fencers went to a classification 9–16 final.
 Finals: There was a main final (top 4 from each semifinal) and a classification 9–16 final (bottom 4 from each semifinal). Each was conducted as a round-robin.

Schedule

Results

Round 1

Each fencer had one bout. The result of the bout did not determine advancement; a jury determined which fencers displayed the most skill. The winner of each bout is unknown. 37 fencers advanced to the quarterfinals. Bouts 1 through 18 were held on 14 May; bouts 19 through 27 were held on 15 May.

Quarterfinals

Again, jury verdicts were used in place of match results to determine those advancing to the semifinals. 10 fencers were selected to advance to the semifinals directly, while 14 were sent to the repechage. Three fencers withdrew. Cahan fenced twice, while Sénat did not fence at all.

Repechage

The matchups in the repechage are not known. Once again, jury verdicts rather than match results mattered. 6 fencers were selected to advance to the semifinals. De Saint-Agnan was selected as an alternate, later competing in the consolation final after the withdrawal of Renaud.

Semifinals

The semifinals were the first round of the foil tournament to use match results in determining advancement. The 16 fencers were divided into two pools. Each fencer then faced each other fencer in his pool once. The four fencers with the best record in each pool moved on to the finals, with the other four competing in the consolation. A barrage was used to break a tie between 4th and 5th place.

Semifinal A

Semifinal B

The win–loss record of fencers in this semifinal is not known.

Finals

Classification 9–16

The eight fencers who had placed in the bottom four of each pool in the semifinals competed for 9th to 16th places in the consolation pool. Renaud withdrew, making room for de Saint-Aignan to be activated from alternate status. The win–loss record of fencers in this pool is not known.

Final

The final was held on 21 May 1900. The top four fencers in each of the two semifinals competed against each other, each fencing the other seven once.

Final classifiation

References

Fencing at the 1900 Summer Olympics